Otto Prutscher (7 April 1880, Vienna — 15 February 1949, Vienna) was an  Austrian architect and designer who worked in the  Vienna Secession style.

Further reading 
 Max Eisler 1915, 1916, 1917, 1922/23, 1925
 M. Tafuri, "La politica residenziale nella Vienna socialista 1919–1933, Milano 1981
 G. Fanelli, E. Godoli, "La Vienna di Hoffmann, architetto della qualità ", Roma- Bari 1981
 Rossana Bossaglia (a cura di) "Le arti a Vienna. Dalla Secessione alla caduta dell'impero asburgico", catalogo della mostra Biennale di Venezia, Venezia-Milano 1984
 Otto Prutscher 1880-1949 in Metamorfosi. Quaderni di architettura 22/23, Roma 1994
• Matthias Boeckl (Red.): Otto Prutscher. 1880–1949. Architektur, Interieur, Design. Der Katalog erscheint anläßlich der Retrospektive „Otto Prutscher 1880–1949“ im Ausstellungszentrum der Hochschule für Angewandte Kunst in Wien, Heiligenkreuzerhof, 23. Jänner bis 15. März 1997. Hochschule für Angewandte Kunst, Wien 1997, ISBN 3-85211-054-8.
 Christoph Thun-Hohenstein und Rainald Franz (eds.): Otto Prutscher. Universal Designer of Viennese Modernism. arnoldsche Art Publishers 2019, .
 Long, Christopher. "Prutscher, Otto." In Grove Art Online. Oxford Art Online,  (accessed February 4, 2012; subscription required).
 
 Schedlmayer, Hermi: "Otto Prutscher - Raum für einen Kunstliebhaber." In: Gustav Klimt und die Kunstschau 1908. Ed. Agnes Husslein-Arco and Alfred Weidinger, Prestel, München 2008, .
 Franz Rainald (a cura di), "Il vetro degli architetti. Vienna 1900-1937", catalogo della mostra, Fondazione Giorgio Cini Venezia, MAK Vienna, Milano 2016
 Thun-Hohenstein Christoph, Franz Rainald(ed.), Otto Prutscher Allgestalter der Wiener Moderne/ Universal designer of Viennese Modernism, MAK Vienna, Vienna 2019 with an essay by Silvia Colombari Campanini, "Otto Prutscher's suitcase between Vienna and Milano: unpublished material from the family archive (pp.109|131)
 G. Belli, E. Pontiggia, L. Pini, V. Terraroli (ed.) "KLIMT l'uomo, l'artista, il suo mondo", catalogo della mostra, Galleria d'arte moderna Ricci Oddi, Piacenza 2022: per la prima volta viene esposto il vaso Cytisus inedito, manifattura Loetz Witwe Serie II, Klostermuhle, 1909, vaso opalescente rosa e blu con piccoli manici, vetro opalescente, 24 x 24 cm, collezione privata.
 James Bradburne (a cura di), "Un filo d'oro. La Collezione Prutscher di libri viennesi per bambini", catalogo della mostra, Biblioteca Nazionale Braidense, Milano 2023

External links 
 
 Entry for Otto Prutscher on the Union List of Artist Names

Austrian designers
Austrian architects
Artists from Vienna
1880 births
1949 deaths
Art Nouveau architects
Wiener Werkstätte